Devjibhai Tandel (born 10 December 1950 in Daman, Daman and Diu) was a member of the 9th Lok Sabha, 10th Lok Sabha and 12th Lok Sabha of India. He represented the Daman and Diu constituency of Daman and Diu and was a member of the Bharatiya Janata Party political party.

References

Lok Sabha members from Daman and Diu
India MPs 1989–1991
1950 births
Living people
Daman and Diu politicians
Bharatiya Janata Party politicians from Daman and Diu
People from Daman district, India
India MPs 1991–1996
India MPs 1998–1999